The Turbomeca Palas is a diminutive centrifugal flow turbojet engine used to power light aircraft. An enlargement of the Turbomeca Piméné, the Palas was designed in 1950 by the French manufacturer Société Turbomeca, and was also produced under licence by Blackburn and General Aircraft in the United Kingdom and Teledyne Continental Motors in the United States as the Continental Model 320.

Applications

Caproni Trento F.5
Curtiss C-46 Commando (two under the fuselage, first flight in October 1952)
Curtiss C-46F Commando (two under the wings)
CVV-6 Canguro Palas
Douglas DC-3 (as a booster engine)
Fouga CM-8 R9.8 Cyclope
Fouga CM-8 R8.3 Midget
Fouga CM.130
Ikarus 451
Ikarus S451M
Ikarus 452M
Mantelli AM-12
Miles Sparrowjet
Payen Pa 49
Short SB.4 Sherpa
SIPA S.200 Minijet
SIPA S.300
Somers-Kendall SK-1
Sud-Ouest Bretagne

Specifications

See also

References
Notes

Bibliography

 Gunston, Bill. World Encyclopedia of Aero Engines. Cambridge, England. Patrick Stephens Limited, 1989.

External links

 Palas at Minijets.org 

Palas
1950s turbojet engines
Centrifugal-flow turbojet engines